Zajezierze  (German Hintersee) is a village in the administrative district of Gmina Sztum, within Sztum County, Pomeranian Voivodeship, in northern Poland.

For the history of the region, see History of Pomerania.

The village has a population of 210.

References

Zajezierze